Gunupur College is a Graduation College located in Gunupur in the eastern state of India and is affiliated to Berhampur University. The college is situated to the eastern end of the town. The college maintains a 40 seated hostel.

History
The college was established  in the year 1973 at Gunupur. It is located at the south-eastern part of Gunupur town. Shri M.Suryanarayana was its first principal and presently Sri Mohan Chandra Sahoo is the Principal (In charge). The College offers degree courses in the arts, science and commerce streams with an intake capacity of 128, 96 and 128 students  respectively.

References

External links
  Gunupur College Home Page
 Higher education in Orissa

Universities and colleges in Odisha
Education in Rayagada district
Educational institutions established in 1973
1973 establishments in Orissa